Greatest Hits... and Misses is a compilation album by American actor, singer and songwriter Paul Jabara. The album includes tracks from Jabara's three studio albums on the Casablanca Records label; Shut Out (1977), Keeping Time (1978) and The Third Album (1979).

Greatest Hits... and Misses was released by PolyGram in 1989, and features Jabara's three duets with Donna Summer; "Shut Out", "Never Lose Your Sense Of Humor" and "Something's Missing", as well as his own solo version of the Academy Award winning "Last Dance".

Track listing

"Ouverture" – 5:33
"Yankee Doodle Dandy" – 2:30
"Hungry for Love" – 2:57
"Sun in Your Smile" – 2:20
"It All Comes Back to You" – 3:25
"Shut Out" [duet with Donna Summer] / "Heaven Is a Disco" – 6:32
"Dance" – 3:46
"Last Dance" – 3:10
"Trapped in a Stairway" – 1:52
"Disco Queen" – 1:50
"Pleasure Island" – 4:47
"Beautiful Dreamer" – 4:34
Medley: "Disco Wedding"/"Honeymoon (In Puerto Rico)"/"Disco Divorce" – 9:29
"Something's Missing" [duet with Donna Summer] – 5:40
"Foggy Day" / "Never Lose Your Sense Of Humor" [duet with Donna Summer] – 7:21
"One Man" / "Finale" – 4:40

Paul Jabara albums
1989 greatest hits albums
Casablanca Records compilation albums